The Psychology of Nuclear Proliferation: Identity, Emotions, and Foreign Policy is a 2006 book by Jacques E. C. Hymans, published by Cambridge University Press. In the book, Hymans draws on the humanities and social sciences to build a  model of decision-making that links identity to emotions and ultimately to nuclear energy policy choices.

See also
List of books about nuclear issues
List of nuclear whistleblowers
Nuclear disarmament
Nuclear weapons

References

2006 non-fiction books
Cambridge University Press books
Books about nuclear issues